Thomas B. Doherty High School, commonly referred to as Doherty High School (DHS), is a public high school in Colorado Springs, Colorado, United States. Established in 1975, it is the newest school in the Colorado Springs School District 11, serving northeast Colorado Springs. The school was named for the District 11 superintendent at the time, Thomas Bernard Doherty.  The schools that feed into Doherty include Jenkins, Russell and Sabin Middle Schools.

The school's colors are blue and green, and the mascot is the Spartan.

Extracurriculars

Athletics
Doherty High School operates a variety of athletic programs.  The facility is home to two gyms, two practice football fields, a soccer field, a baseball field, a softball field, a swimming pool, and a wrestling room. Doherty plays its Varsity and JV homes games for football, Varsity men's and women's soccer at Gary Berry Stadium located near Wasson High School.

Notable alumni

Adam Goucher, cross-country runner
Lamarr Houston, NFL Chicago Bears player
Mark Huismann, Major League Baseball pitcher
Haleigh Washington, United States women's national volleyball team member and professional volleyball player.

References

External links

High schools in Colorado Springs, Colorado
Public high schools in Colorado